Matej Černič (born 13 September 1978) is an Italian volleyball player who won the silver medal with the Italian men's national team at the 2004 Summer Olympics, held in Athens. He is of Slovene ethnicity and belongs to the Slovene minority in Italy.

Sporting achievements

Individually
 2009 Memorial of Hubert Jerzy Wagner - Best Receiver

State awards
 2004  Officer's Order of Merit of the Italian Republic

External links
 CONI profile

References

1978 births
Living people
Italian Slovenes
People from Gorizia
Italian men's volleyball players
Volleyball players at the 2004 Summer Olympics
Olympic volleyball players of Italy
Olympic silver medalists for Italy
Olympic medalists in volleyball
Fenerbahçe volleyballers
Iraklis V.C. players
Expatriate volleyball players in Poland
Medalists at the 2004 Summer Olympics
Resovia (volleyball) players
Sportspeople from Friuli-Venezia Giulia